La Flambleuse is a 1981 French drama film directed by Rachel Weinberg.

Plot 
It tells the story of a woman hooked to gambling who begins neglecting her husband and children.

Cast 

 Lea Massari: Louise
 Laurent Terzieff: Le Chevalier
 Gérard Blain: Henri
 Évelyne Dress: Clémentine
 Didier Sauvegrain: Maxence
 Gabriel Jabbour: the professor
 Claude Brosset: the Hungarian
 Pierre Saintons: the postman
 Rudolf Monori: Xavier
 Jacques Serres: Loulou
 Gérard Cuvier: the café owner
 Nicolas Chesnay: Benoît
 Vincent Blanchet: Jean-Pierre
 Jean-Marie Marguet: Manetto
 Florence Blot: Adélaïde
 Roland Timsit: Jean-Luc
 Maurice Rollet: the surgeon
 Marc de Jonge: De Boissouvre

References

1981 films
1980s French-language films
1980s French films
1981 drama films
French drama films